, also known as the Tosa Kaidō, is a Japanese highway on the island of Shikoku. It originates at the intersection of Route 32 and other arteries in the city of Kōchi (capital of Kōchi Prefecture) and terminates in the city of Matsuyama (capital of Ehime Prefecture), where it meets Route 11 and other national highways. Its history dates to the year 662.

Route data
Length: 122.9 km (76.4 mi)
Origin: Kōchi (originates at the terminus of Routes 32 and 55 and the origin of Routes 55, 194, 195, 197 and 493) 
Terminus: Matsuyama (ends at the terminus of Routes 11 and 56)
Major cities: Niyodogawa, Kumakōgen

History
1952-12-04 - First Class National Highway 33 (from Kōchi to Matsuyama)
1965-04-01 - General National Highway 33 (from Kōchi to Matsuyama)

References

033
Roads in Ehime Prefecture
Roads in Kōchi Prefecture